Pin the tail on the donkey is a game played by groups of children. The earliest version listed in a catalog of American games compiled by the American Game Collectors Association in 1998, is dated 1899, and attributed to Charles Zimmerling. 

It is common at birthday parties and other gatherings. A picture of a donkey with a missing tail is tacked to a wall within easy reach of children.
One at a time, each child is blindfolded and handed a paper "tail" with a push pin or thumbtack poked through it. The blindfolded child is then spun around until disoriented. The child gropes around and tries to pin the tail on the donkey.  The player who pins their tail closest to the target, the donkey's rear, wins.  The game, a group activity, is generally not competitive; "winning" is only of marginal importance. It is often seen as more entertaining, seeing the children stumble around and try to put their tail at the right place.

The game is also used in child development research.

The game can also be played by teenagers and adults, especially if the "donkey" is replaced with depictions of something or someone else.  As a drinking game, the person with the worst tail pinning is awarded one shot of a selected alcohol, to be determined by house rules or the loser in a friendly environment.

Idiomatically, the term can be used derisively for any assigned activity which is pointless or for which a person has been handicapped (blindfolded).

See also
Eeyore, a character who loses his tail and has to have it pinned back on.
Fukuwarai, a similar Japanese game
Piñata

References

Children's games
Entertainment in the United States
Entertainment in the United Kingdom
Party games